Vicks 44 Pediatric can be one of two therapies, Vicks 44M Pediatric or Vicks 44E Pediatric, marketed in North America under the Vicks brand of Procter & Gamble.

Vicks 44M Pediatric
Vicks 44M Pediatric (or 44M) is an oral combination therapy for breathing difficulties.  Active ingredients include dextromethorphan, pseudoephedrine and chlorpheniramine.  The combination of antihistamine, de-congestant and cough suppressant is designed to relieve the symptoms of several minor breathing complaints, such as the common cold.

Side effects
Possible side effect include drowsiness, dizziness, nausea, constipation, blurred vision, upset stomach and dry mouth nose and throat.

Vicks 44E Pediatric
Vicks 44E Pediatric (or 44E) is an oral combination therapy for breathing difficulties.  Active ingredients are dextromethorphan and guaifenesin a cough suppressant and an expectorant, respectively.

Side effects
Common side effects include drowsiness, dizziness and upset stomach.

References

External links
 44M at www.drugs.com
 44E at www.drugs.com

Antitussives